José Óscar Recio Arreola (born June 23, 1989, in Monterrey) is a Mexican footballer.

Club career
On April 13, 2012, Recio signed a loan deal with the Houston Dynamo of Major League Soccer.

References

External links
 

1989 births
Living people
Footballers from Nuevo León
Association football defenders
C.F. Monterrey players
Atlante F.C. footballers
C.F. Mérida footballers
Indios de Ciudad Juárez footballers
Houston Dynamo FC players
Expatriate soccer players in the United States
Sportspeople from Monterrey
Mexican footballers